Loch Lomond Rowing Club is a rowing club on the River Leven, based at Heather Avenue, Balloch, Alexandria, West Dunbartonshire. The club is affiliated to Scottish Rowing.

History
The club was established on Loch Lomond in 1827 and is the oldest rowing club in Scotland. In the early 1970s the clubhouse moved to its present location next to the Angling Club.

The club has produced several national champions.

Notable members
Jim McNiven
Jim Paton 
Peter Haining

Honours

National champions

References

Sport in West Dunbartonshire
Rowing clubs in Scotland